Paul L. Foster is an American businessman who is the CEO of Franklin Mountain Investments.  He is the founder and former chairman of the board of Western Refining, a Fortune 200 and Global 2000 oil refiner and marketer based in El Paso, Texas.

Life 

Foster was raised in Lovington, New Mexico, and attended Baylor University, where he was a member of the Texas Theta chapter of Sigma Alpha Epsilon, graduating in 1979 with a bachelor's degree in accounting. He would later serve on his alma mater's business school's advisory board from 2008 to 2010, and in 2006 donated $3 million to the university, to build the Paul L. Foster Success Center, a clearinghouse where students can receive academic and career help. In 2013, he donated a further $35 million, the majority of which was designated to fund the $100 million, 275,000-square-foot Paul L. Foster Campus for Business and Innovation (housing Baylor's existing Hankamer School of Business). Part of the gift was also earmarked for the $260 million McLane Stadium project.

In 1997, Foster founded Western Refining, which became the fourth-largest publicly traded independent oil refinery in the United States by 2006.

In 2007, he appeared on the Forbes 400 list of wealthiest Americans, ranking 261st with a net worth estimated at $1.9 billion. , Forbes lists his net worth as $1.5 billion.  He served as chairman of the board of regents of the University of Texas System.

In 2007, Foster donated $50 million to help create the Paul L. Foster School of Medicine at Texas Tech University Health Sciences Center in El Paso. Foster and his wife donated $5 million to help fund major renovation of the 55-year-old Sun Bowl Stadium at the University of Texas at El Paso.

In November 2007, Foster was appointed to the board of regents of the University of Texas System by Governor Rick Perry.  In 2009, Foster was elected vice chairman of the board of regents.  In 2010 and 2011, he was re-elected as vice-chairman.  In 2012, he was elected as chairman of the board of regents.  In 2013, he was re-appointed to the board of regents. Currently, Foster serves on the board of trustees for the Baylor College of Medicine and is a member of the Texas Parks and Wildlife Commission.

Foster has donated at least one million dollars to Freedom Partners Action Fund, a conservative Super PAC affiliated with the Koch Brothers.

Foster currently serves as chair of the Electric Reliability Council of Texas (ERCOT).

References

Living people
Businesspeople from El Paso, Texas
University of Texas System
People from Lovington, New Mexico
Baylor University alumni
1959 births